Pinotin A is a pinotin, a type of pyranoanthocyanins and a class of phenolic compounds found in red wine.

See also 
 Pinotin A aglycone
 Phenolic content in wine

References

External links 
 Pinotin A on www.phenol-explorer.eu

Pyranoanthocyanins